Midpoint theorem may refer to the following mathematical theorems:

 Midpoint theorem (triangle)
 Midpoint theorem (conics)
 Midpoint theorem, describes the properties of medians in a triangle, see Median (triangle)
 Midpoint theorem, also known as Midpoint Formula